Jolonica is a genus of brachiopods belonging to the family Frenulinidae.

The species of this genus are found in Southern Africa and Australia.

Species:

Jolonica alcocki 
Jolonica elliptica 
Jolonica hedleyi 
Jolonica iduensis 
Jolonica macneili 
Jolonica nipponica 
Jolonica ryukyuensis 
Jolonica suffusa

References

Brachiopod genera